Derby Airport  is located  southeast of Derby, Western Australia.

History

The site of Derby airport was first set aside for aviation uses in 1922. The airfield played a key role in the search for Charles Kingsford Smith's Southern Cross following a forced landing in the Kimberley region during 1929 in an incident that would become known as the "Coffee Royal Affair". Aviation pioneer Norman Brearley used aircraft of his West Australian Airways in the initial search effort flying outwards from Derby.

In 1938 it was proposed that Derby be used as a base for flying boat services carrying air mail from London to Australia via Egypt and Ceylon (Sri Lanka).

See also
 Curtin Airport, nearby military base which hosted commercial passenger flights to Derby
 List of airports in Western Australia
 Aviation transport in Australia

References

External links
 Airservices Aerodromes & Procedure Charts

Kimberley airports
Airports established in 1922